is a 2012 Japanese drama film directed by Nobuhiko Ôbayashi.

Premise
Endo Reiko visits Nagaoka to report on the aftermath of an earthquake. During the visit she is approached by her former boyfriend, Kenichi, who tries to convince her to become the star of a play that takes place in the city during the Second World War. The movie includes ruminations on the dark side of the Japanese character.

Cast

 Yasuko Matsuyuki - Reiko Endo
 Masahiro Takashima - Kenichi Katayama
 Natsuki Harada -Wakako Inoue
 Minami Inomata - Motoki Hana
 Saki Terashima
 Toshio Kakei Goro Matsushita
 Naoyuki Morita 
 Mansaku Ikeuchi
 Takashi Sasano Akiyoshi Muraoka
 Koji Ishikawa
 Takahito Hosoyamada
 Toshinori Omi
 Takehiro Murata
 Misako Renbutsu
 Takuro Atsuki
 Tôru Shinagawa
 Akira Emoto
 Chôei Takahashi
 Shirô Namiki
 Yuto Kobayashi
 Mayuu Kusakari
 Kanae Katsuno
 Tomoko Hoshino
 Toshie Negishi
 Shusaku Uchida
 Tsurutaro Kataoka - Makoto Nose 
 Hiroshi Inuzuka - Tsurukichi Nose
 Masayuki Yui
 Bengaru
 Masao Kusakari - Jyuzaburo Hanagata
 Sumiko Fuji - Ririko Motoki
 Shiho Fujimura - Kaoru Endo

References

External links
 

Japanese drama films
2012 drama films
2012 films
Films directed by Nobuhiko Obayashi
Films scored by Kousuke Yamashita
2010s Japanese films